Godfrey (died 1088) was a medieval Bishop of Chichester. The first Bishop of Chichester was Stigand, who died in 1087; it seems that he was followed by Godfrey. Confusion over the succession was generated by William of Malmesbury, who suggested that Stigand was succeeded by a Bishop William.

Background
Following the Norman Conquest of 1066, the English church was gradually restructured along the lines of the episcopal organization in Normandy. As part of this process, almost all of the Anglo-Saxon bishops of English Sees were replaced by Normans. In 1070, Æthelric II of Selsey was deposed from his episcopate and replaced by William the Conqueror's chaplain Stigand. Then under Stigand the see was transferred from Selsey to Chichester.

Life

On Stigand's death, Godfrey was nominated, by Lanfranc, Archbishop of Canterbury, in 1087–1088; his nomination is recorded in the Acta Lanfranci. Godfrey's death on 25 September 1088 is recorded in the Annales Cicestrensis, under 1088.

Little is known of his background, except he had been a royal chaplain. So little was known of him, that the medieval historians, William of Malmesbury and Florence of Worcester mistakenly called him William instead of Godfrey.

The historian Henry Mayr-Harting suggests that it can be shown that William of Malmesbury and Florence of Worcester were mistaken. There could be no doubt that Godfrey was the only bishop between Stigand and Ralph de Luffa. His evidence being Godfrey's profession of obedience   to Lanfranc, in 1088, also his name in both the Chichester and Winchester annals, and the leaden absolution that was buried with him.

Lead cross
In Christianity, it was unusual for the deceased to be interred with the accoutrements of life, the only exceptions were the vestments with which some great men such as bishops were buried. According to Lanfranc's Constitutions a written absolution of sins would be placed on the chest of a dead monk in their tomb, while an inscribed lead cross served a similar purpose for prelates.  In 1830, some workmen, digging a drain in the medieval burial ground, known as Paradise, a part of the cathedral cloisters, discovered a lead cross. Four years earlier a stone coffin had been found in the same area, it is believed that the two were linked. The cross had a Latin inscription on it, the translation in English reads:

Vacant bishopric
After Godfrey's death, the see lay vacant until 1090 or 1091. The 19th-century historian W. R. W. Stephens said that the cause of the vacancy was due to "the grasping avarice of the red king, who protracted episcopal vacancies to the utmost extent, that he might enrich his own treasury with the temporalities of the sees." The church and William II were certainly in conflict for much of his reign. When bishoprics and abbeys became vacant William was able to take the revenues from them until the post was filled by a new bishop or abbot. William would often auction these positions off to the highest bidder.

Notes

Citations

References

 
 
 
 
 
 
 
 
 
 

1088 deaths
Bishops of Chichester
Year of birth unknown
11th-century English Roman Catholic bishops